Hikari-Man (stylized as HIKARI-MAN) is a Japanese manga series written and illustrated by Hideo Yamamoto. It was serialized in Shogakukan's seinen manga magazine Weekly Big Comic Spirits from December 2014 to June 2020, with its chapters collected in eight tankōbon volumes.

Publication
Hikari-Man is written and illustrated by Hideo Yamamoto. It was serialized in Shogakukan's seinen manga magazine Weekly Big Comic Spirits from December 8, 2014 to June 22, 2020.<ref></p></ref><ref></p></ref> Shogakukan collected its chapters in eight tankōbon volumes, released from February 27, 2015 to September 11, 2020.

The manga is licensed in France by Delcourt/Tonkam.

Volume list

Reception
Hikari-Man was one of the Jury Recommended Works at the 23rd Japan Media Arts Festival in 2020.

References

Further reading

External links
 

Seinen manga
Shogakukan manga